This article lists described species of the family Asilidae start with letter V.

A
B
C
D
E
F
G
H
I
J
K
L
M
N
O
P
Q
R
S
T
U
V
W
Y
Z

List of Species

Genus Valiraptor
 Valiraptor montanus (Londt, 2002)
 Valiraptor namibiensis (Londt, 2002)
 Valiraptor silvestris (Londt, 2002)
 Valiraptor vittatus (Londt, 2002)

References 

 
Asilidae